All Jammu and Kashmir Muslim Conference may refer to:

 Jammu & Kashmir National Conference, formerly known as All Jammu and Kashmir Muslim Conference
 All Jammu and Kashmir Muslim Conference, a splinter party from the National Conference